The 2021 Garden Open II was a professional tennis tournament played on clay courts. It was the thirteenth edition of the tournament which was part of the 2021 ATP Challenger Tour. It took place in Rome, Italy between 26 April and 2 May 2021.

Singles main-draw entrants

Seeds

 1 Rankings as of 19 April 2021.

Other entrants
The following players received wildcards into the singles main draw:
  Flavio Cobolli
  Stefano Napolitano
  Giulio Zeppieri

The following player received entry into the singles main draw as a special exempt:
  Andrea Pellegrino

The following player received entry into the singles main draw using a protected ranking:
  Thanasi Kokkinakis

The following player received entry into the singles main draw as an alternate:
  Andrea Collarini

The following players received entry from the qualifying draw:
  Tristan Lamasine
  Felipe Meligeni Alves
  Nino Serdarušić
  Igor Sijsling

Champions

Singles

  Juan Manuel Cerúndolo def.  Flavio Cobolli 6–2, 3–6, 6–3.

Doubles

  Sadio Doumbia /  Fabien Reboul def.  Guido Andreozzi /  Guillermo Durán 7–5, 6–3.

References

2021 ATP Challenger Tour
2021
2021 in Italian tennis
April 2021 sports events in Italy
May 2021 sports events in Italy